ADS 1359 is a quadruple star system in the constellation Cassiopeia. It is composed of two sun like stars in an eclipsing binary with a 2.5-day period, which is in turn orbited by an A-type main-sequence star with a 185-year orbital period. There is also HD 236848 which is a distant proper motion companion.

Visual binary
The visual binary was discovered by Sherburne Wesley Burnham at Dearborn Observatory in Chicago in 1880. A first preliminary orbit was calculated in 1971 by astronomer Georgije Popović using observations from 1880 to 1967. Improved orbits were calculated in 1995, 2009 and 2017. The two stars were separated by  when they were discovered, but only  in 2010.

Eclipsing binary
ADS 1359 was discovered by the Hipparcos spacecraft to be a detached eclipsing binary and given the variable star designation V773 Cassiopeiae.  The derived period of variability was 1.29 days, exactly half the orbital period of the inner pair since each orbit produces two almost-identical eclipses.  The eclipsing stars are the inner pair of the system.  The two stars combined are still about eight times fainter than the third star and so the eclipses decrease the overall brightness of V773 Cas by less than 0.1 magnitudes.

HD 236848
The Washington Double Star Catalog lists a 16th magnitude companion as component C and a 10th magnitude companion as component D.  Component D is HD 236848 and it shares the same space motion and distance as the inner three stars.

References

Cassiopeia (constellation)
Cassiopeiae, V773
10543
8115
499
Durchmusterung objects
Spectroscopic binaries
Eclipsing binaries
G-type main-sequence stars
A-type main-sequence stars
4